Gery Tueba Menayame (born 13 March 1963), known simply as Tueba, is a Congolese retired footballer who played as a right midfielder.

He spent most of his professional career in Portugal, appearing for six different clubs and amassing Primeira Liga totals of 169 matches and eight goals over seven seasons.

Club career
Tueba was born in Kinshasa, Zaire. After arriving in Portugal at age 23 from AS Vita Club, he went on to spend the following decade in the country, starting out with Primeira Liga club S.L. Benfica and helping it to three national accolades during his two-year spell, although he never was an undisputed starter.

Released in summer 1988, after the team lost the final of the European Cup to PSV Eindhoven – he was not picked for the decisive game's squad – Tueba consolidated himself in the Portuguese top flight in the following years, successively representing Vitória de Setúbal, F.C. Tirsense, S.C. Farense and Gil Vicente FC. In 1993, he moved to the second division with Leixões SC, then continued to play in the country until the age of 37, his final years being spent in amateur football.

International career
Tueba represented Zaire at the 1992 African Cup of Nations in Senegal, scoring one goal for the eventual quarter-finalists.

Honours
Benfica
Primeira Liga: 1986–87
Taça de Portugal: 1986–87
Supertaça Cândido de Oliveira: 1986
European Cup: Runner-up 1987–88

References

External links

1963 births
Living people
Footballers from Kinshasa
Democratic Republic of the Congo footballers
Association football midfielders
AS Vita Club players
Primeira Liga players
Liga Portugal 2 players
Segunda Divisão players
S.L. Benfica footballers
Vitória F.C. players
F.C. Tirsense players
S.C. Farense players
Gil Vicente F.C. players
Leixões S.C. players
Amora F.C. players
S.C. Dragões Sandinenses players
Democratic Republic of the Congo international footballers
1988 African Cup of Nations players
1992 African Cup of Nations players
Democratic Republic of the Congo expatriate footballers
Expatriate footballers in Portugal
Democratic Republic of the Congo expatriate sportspeople in Portugal